Thompson Dimock Weeks (November 5, 1832February 12, 1901) was an American lawyer and Republican politician.  He served six years in the Wisconsin State Senate, representing Walworth County, and was president pro tempore of the Senate during the 1895–1896 session.  He also served one term in the Wisconsin State Assembly.

Biography

Born in Norwich, Massachusetts, he settled in Lyons, Wisconsin Territory, in 1843. Weeks then moved to Whitewater, Wisconsin in 1860. Weeks graduated from Lawrence University in 1858 and Albany Law School in 1859. He then practiced law in Wisconsin. Weeks served in the Wisconsin State Assembly in 1867 as a Republican and then in the Wisconsin State Senate in 1874 and in 1895. Weeks also served on the board or regents for Wisconsin normal schools. He died in Whitewater, Wisconsin.

References

External links
 

1832 births
1901 deaths
People from Huntington, Massachusetts
Republican Party members of the Wisconsin State Assembly
Republican Party Wisconsin state senators
People from Walworth County, Wisconsin
People from Whitewater, Wisconsin
Wisconsin lawyers
Lawrence University alumni
Albany Law School alumni
19th-century American politicians